Vårparnatt is a Swedish fertility festival stemming from the country District, Medelpad. As a holiday, it grew into brief popularity during the 18th century, but quickly faded from popularity, replaced by the more widespread Midsommar

Origins 

The holiday originates in Pagan folklore, it coincided with the harvest of rutabagas, traditionally set on the 9th of January. The day is meant to usher in the days of bloom and celebrate female fertility.  The celebrations themselves involved dances, predominantly variations of the Swedish Schottis and Slängpolska. The dances often incorporated potatoes, serving as an emblem of fertility.

References 

Medelpad